Mode II may refer to:
 Acheulean or Mode II, archaeological culture's method of fabricating flint tools
 Mode II crack or sliding mode of propagation of a fracture